Kalitta may refer to:

Connie Kalitta (born 1938), a retired American drag racer and CEO of the eponymous Kalitta Air.
Doug Kalitta (born 1964), an American drag racer, nephew of Connie Kalitta and owner of Kalitta Charters.
Scott Kalitta (1962-2008), an American drag racer and son of Connie Kalitta.
Kalitta Air, a cargo airline flying Boeing 747 aircraft.
Kalitta Charters, a cargo airline flying medium-sized aircraft.